São Pedro, Portuguese for Saint Peter, may refer to the following places:

Brazil
 Águas de São Pedro, a municipality in the State of São Paulo
 Rio Grande de São Pedro, former name of the municipality of Rio Grande in the state of Rio Grande do Sul
 São Pedro da Água Branca, a municipality in the State of Maranhão
 São Pedro da Aldeia, a municipality in the State of Rio de Janeiro
 São Pedro da Serra, a municipality in the State of Rio Grande do Sul
 São Pedro da União, a municipality in the State of Minas Gerais
 São Pedro das Missões, a municipality in the State of Rio Grande do Sul
 São Pedro de Alcântara, a municipality in the State of Santa Catarina
 São Pedro do Butiá, a municipality in the State of Rio Grande do Sul
 São Pedro do Iguaçu, a municipality in the State of Paraná
 São Pedro do Ivaí, a municipality in the State of Paraná
 São Pedro do Paraná, a municipality in the State of Paraná
 São Pedro do Piauí, a municipality in the State of Piauí
 São Pedro do Suaçuí, a municipality in the State of Minas Gerais
 São Pedro do Turvo, a municipality in the State of São Paulo
 São Pedro dos Crentes, a municipality in the State of Maranhão
 São Pedro, Rio Grande do Norte, a municipality in the State of Rio Grande do Norte
 São Pedro, São Paulo, a municipality in the State of São Paulo

Portugal
 São Pedro (Alandroal), a civil parish in the municipality of Alandroal
 São Pedro (Celorico da Beira), a civil parish in the municipality of Celorico da Beira
 São Pedro (Covilhã), a civil parish in the municipality of Covilhã
 São Pedro (Faro), a civil parish in the municipality of Faro
 São Pedro (Figueira da Foz), a civil parish in the municipality of Figueira da Foz
 São Pedro (Gouveia), a civil parish in the municipality of Gouveia
 São Pedro (Manteigas), a civil parish in the municipality of Manteigas
 São Pedro (Óbidos), a civil parish in the municipality of Óbidos
 São Pedro (Peniche), a civil parish in the municipality of Peniche
 São Pedro (Porto de Mós), a civil parish in the municipality of Porto de Mós
 São Pedro (Torres Novas), a civil parish in the municipality of Torres Novas
 São Pedro (Trancoso), a civil parish in the municipality of Trancoso
 São Pedro (Vila Real), a civil parish in the municipality of Vila Real
 São Pedro de Balsemão, a civil parish in the municipality of Lamego
 São Pedro de Este, a civil parish in the district of Braga
 São Pedro de Esteval, a civil parish in the municipality of Proenca-a-Nova
 São Pedro de Sarracenos, a civil parish in the municipality of Bragança

Archipelago of the Azores 
 São Pedro (Angra do Heroísmo),  a civil parish in the municipality of Angra do  Heroísmo, Terceira
 São Pedro (Ponta Delgada),  a civil parish in the municipality of Ponta Delgada, São Miguel Island
 São Pedro (Vila do Porto),  a civil parish in the municipality of Vila do Porto, Santa Maria Island
 São Pedro (Vila Franca do Campo), a civil parish in the municipality of Vila Franca  do  Campo, São Miguel Island

Madeira 
 São Pedro (Funchal), a civil parish in the municipality of Funchal

Cape Verde 
 São Pedro, Cape Verde

Football clubs
 São Pedro Atlético Clube

See also
 São Pedro River (disambiguation)